The Battle of Yamama was fought in December 632 as part of the Ridda Wars against a rebellion within the Rashidun Caliphate in the region of al-Yamama (in present-day Saudi Arabia) between the forces of Abu Bakr and Musaylima, a self-proclaimed prophet.

Background

After the death of the Islamic prophet Muhammad, many Arab tribes rebelled against the State of Medina. Caliph Abu Bakr organized 11 corps to deal with the rebels. Abu Bakr appointed Ikrima as the commander of one of the corps. Ikrima's orders were to advance and make contact with the forces of Musaylima at al-Yamama, but not to get involved in battle with him. Ikrima had insufficient forces to attack the overwhelmingly more numerous foe. Khalid ibn al-Walid was chosen to command the forces opposing Musaylima after he dealt with other smaller apostates. Abu Bakr's intention in giving Ikrima this mission was to tie Musaylima down at Yamama. With Ikrima on the horizon, Musaylima would remain in expectation of an attack and thus not be able to leave his base. With Musaylima so committed, Khalid would be free to deal with the rebels of North-Central Arabia without interference from Yamama. Ikrima advanced with his corps and established a camp somewhere in the region of Yamama.

The location of his camp is not known. From this base he kept the forces of the Bani Hanifa under observation while awaiting instructions from the Caliph, and the presence of Ikrima had the desired effect of keeping Musaylima in Yamama. 

The following passage has been quoted directly from and is written in the form of a legend or epic with a moral at the end. 
When Ikrima received reports of the defeat of Tulayha by Khalid, he began to get impatient for battle. Ikrima was a fearless man and a forceful general, but he lacked Khalid's cool judgement and patience – qualities which distinguish the bold commander from the rash one. The next development that Ikrima heard of was that Shurahbil ibn Hasana was marching to join him. Shurahbil too had been given a corps by the Caliph with orders to follow Ikrima, and await further instructions. In a few days, Shurahbil would be with him. Then came news of how Khalid had routed the forces of Salma, the queenly leader of men. Ikrima could wait no longer, and he set his corps in motion. This happened at the end of October 632 (end of Rajab, 11 Hijri). He was defeated by Musaylima. He wrote to Abu Bakr and gave him a complete account of his actions. Abu Bakr was both pained and angered by the rashness of Ikrima and his disobedience to the orders given to him. Abu Bakr ordered him to march to Mahra to help Arfaja and thereafter go to the Yemen to help Muhajir. Shurahbil remained in the region of Yamama. To ensure that he did not fall into the error of Ikrima, Abu Bakr wrote to him: "Stay where you are and await further instructions."

The Caliph sent for Khalid and gave him the mission of destroying the forces of Musaylima at Yamama. In addition to his own large corps, Khalid would have under his command the corps of Shurahbil. Khalid rode to Buta where his old corps awaited him. Meanwhile, the Caliph wrote to Shurahbil to work under Khalid ibn al-Walid's command. A few days before Khalid's arrival Shurahbil had given in to the same temptation as Ikrima; he had advanced and clashed with Musaylima, but was defeated. Khalid got news that Musaylima was encamped in the plain of Aqraba with an army of 40,000 warriors. The two successful actions fought by them against Ikrima and Shurahbil had increased their confidence in themselves and created an aura of invincibility around Musaylima.

The Second Strike of the Muslims

On the orders of Khalid, the Muslims advanced. They launched a series of attacks along their entire front. The most dreadful carnage took place in a gulley in which human blood ran in a rivulet down to the wadi. As a result, this gulley became known as the Gulley of Blood-Shueib-ud-Dam, and it is still known by that name.

But the battle hung in the balance. As the first period of combat ended, the warriors retired to rest.

The next phase of battle - known as the second strike of the Muslims - is clouded with legend but from the myths alone we can determine that the apostate force largely disintegrated.

Last Phase of the Battle

Only about a quarter of Musaylima's army remained in fighting shape, and this part hastened to the walled garden while Muhakim (commander of the right wing) covered its retreat with a small rear-guard. Soon the Muslims arrived at the walled garden, where a little over 7,000 rebels, Musaylima among them, had taken shelter. The rebels had closed the gate. The Muslims were anxious to get into the garden and finish the job.

Soon a Muslim soldier al-Bara' ibn Malik asked his fellow men to let him climb the wall so that he could open the gate by killing the guards there. The soldier jumped in to the garden and opened the gate. The Muslims entered the garden and the last phase of the Battle of Yamama had begun.

The Garden of Death

The rebels stepped back as the Muslims poured into the garden. The fighting became more vicious. Musaylima was still fighting: he had no intention of giving up. As the front moved closer to him, he joined in the combat. The last phase of the battle now entered its climax. The Muslim army pressed the rebels everywhere. Musaylima became the target of Wahshi ibn Harb (the same man who killed Hamza, the uncle of Muhammad, in the Battle of Uhud). He threw the same javelin that he had used to kill Hamza ibn Abd al-Muttalib and struck Musaylima in the stomach; the next moment Abu Dujana cut off Musaylima's head. The news of the death of Musaylima brought about the rout of his forces. The garden where this last phase of the battle took place became known as the "Garden of Death", as the approximately 7,000 rebels within it were slaughtered.

Aftermath
The rebellion within the Rashidun Caliphate was crushed, and victory belonged to Abu Bakr. The people of Medina experienced sadness and joy with that battle. They were satisfied that the chaos caused by Musaylima was put to an end, but the cost of a martyr from every home also was devastating to them.

Impact
The battle played a major role in motivating Abu Bakr to complete the compilation of the Qur'an. During the life of Muhammad, many parts of the written Quran were scattered among his companions, retained as private possession. However, about 360 huffaz (Muslims who had memorized the Qur'an) died at Yamama. Consequently, upon the insistence of his future successor Umar, Abu Bakr ordered the collection of all the surviving pieces (whither on papyrus, palm stock, etc.) of the Qur'an into one copy and the rest be burnt.

References

Bibliography
A.I. Akram, The Sword of Allah: Khalid bin al-Waleed, His Life and Campaigns, Nat. Publishing. House, Rawalpindi (1970) .

External links
A.I. Akram, The Sword of Allah: Khalid bin al-Waleed, His Life and Campaigns Lahore, 1969

Battles of Khalid ibn Walid
Battles involving the Rashidun Caliphate
630s conflicts
632
630s in the Rashidun Caliphate
Ridda Wars